Domont is a commune in the Val-d'Oise department and Île-de-France region of France. It is twinned with the Leicestershire village of Shepshed. Domont station has rail connections to Persan, Luzarches, Sarcelles and Paris.

Population

Twin towns — sister cities
Domont is twinned with:
 Germering, Germany (1984)
 Shepshed, United Kingdom (1989)
 Wolsztyn, Poland (2005)
 Buja, Italy (2009)

Notable people from Domont
Bedi Buval footballer
Jean-Pierre Changeux neuroscientist
Yoann Djidonou footballer
Rémi Maréval footballer
Bertrand Ndzomo footballer
Eugene Jules Houdry Inventor

See also
Communes of the Val-d'Oise department

References

External links
Official website 

Association of Mayors of the Val d'Oise 

Communes of Val-d'Oise